The Tlingit clans of Southeast Alaska, in the United States, are one of the indigenous cultures within Alaska.  The Tlingit people also live in the Northwest Interior of British Columbia, Canada, and in the southern Yukon Territory. There are two main Tlingit lineages or moieties within Alaska, which are subdivided into a number of clans and houses.

Tlingit moieties 

The Tlingit people of Southeast Alaska have two moieties (otherwise known as descent groups) in their society, each of which is divided into a number of clans. Each clan has its own history, songs, and totems, and each forms a social network of extended families which functions as a political unit in Tlingit society.

The two moieties of the Tlingit society are the Raven (Yéil) and Eagle/Wolf (Ch'aak'/Gooch). The latter has two names because its primary crest differs between the north and the south regions of Tlingit territory, probably due to influence from the neighboring tribes of Haida, Tsimshian and Nisga'a. Each moiety is further subdivided into clans, and each clan is subdivided into houses.

Clan names, crests and political structure
The Tlingit clans have names whose meaning typically reflects the foundation story of the clan. The clans are usually referred to in English by the name of their primary crest, such as Deisheetaan being called "Beaver Clan". This is not accurate since some crests may be held by multiple clans. Clans of opposite moieties occasionally claim the same crest, but such irregular ownership is usually due to a debt owed by some other clan; until the debt is paid, the clan holding the debt claims the crest of the clan which owes the debt, as a means of shaming it.

Clan allegiance is governed through a matrilineal system; children are born to the mother's clan and gain their status within her family, including what was traditionally hereditary leadership positions. The parents are required to be from differing clans; the children are born from the father, but he has a lesser role in their rearing than does the mother's brothers.

Not all clans listed below are extant today; some have been absorbed into other clans; others have died out due to the lack of female descendants, and a few have been lost to history.  Not all the clans are independent, since clans formed in a long and fluid process.  For instance, the Kak'weidí descend from the Deisheetaan.  Some members claim that they are a "house" within the Deisheetaan clan; others claim that they are a small but fully independent clan.

List of clans 
In the list below the Tlingit name of the clan is given with its primary crest in parentheses, followed by the various kwáan (region or village) in which they are found. Known houses are listed beneath each clan.

Clans of the Raven moiety (Yéil naa)
 Gaanax.ádi — Galyáx, Xunaa, T'aaku, Aak'w, S'awdáan, Takjik'aan, Taant'a
 Táakw.aaneidí 
  L'uknax.ádi (Coho salmon)
 Gaanaxteidee (hibernation frog/strong man/wood worm) 
 T'éex'.ádi
 Ishkeetaan/Ishkahítaan (Ganaxteidee) (Hibernation Frog) same as Ganaxteidee (di)
 X'at'ka.aayí 
 Koosk'eidí/Xaas híttaan
 X'alchaneidí
 Kiks.ádi (Frog/Herring, Rock)
 Teeyhíttaan
 Teeyineidí
 Deisheetaan (Beaver/Dragonfly) — 
 Aanx'aakíttaan/Aanx'aak híttaan
 L'eeneidí (Dog Salmon)
 T'akdeintaan (Sea Pigeon)
 L'ukwaax.ádi
 Noowshaka.aayí
 Kwáashk'ikwáan/Kwáashk' Kwáan
 Weix'hineidí
 Yéeskaneidí
 L'ookwhineidí
 Kuyeidí
 Téel' híttaan
 Sakwteeneidí/Sukwteeneidí
 Kijookw híttaan/Gijookw híttaan
 Taneidí
 Kookw híttaan
 Kayaa.ádi
 Tukwyeidí/Tukwweidí
 Kaasx'agweidí
 Taalkweidí
 Kuyéik'.ádi
 HeHL -non Tlinget Indigenous Peoples(Raven Moieties- Bear/Badger/Wolf/Sea Monster)

Clans of the Eagle/Wolf moiety (Ch'aak'/Gooch naa)
 Kaagwaantaan (WOLF)
 Yanyeidí
 Lkweidi
 Teikweidí BROWN BEAR
 Dagisdinaa
 Jishkweidí
 Dakl'aweidí -(House/Killer Whale Clan/Wolf Clan)
 Shangukeidí - THUNDERBIRD
 Wooshkeetaan - SHARK
 Chookaneidí - GLACIER BEAR
 Kadakw.ádi
 Tsaateeneidí
 S'eet'kweidí
 Kookhittaan - BEAR - BOX HOUSE
 Tsaagweidí - killerwhale
 Nees.ídi
 Was'ineidí - BEAR
 Naasteidí
 Kayaashkeiditaan
 Naanyaa.aayí
 Sik'nax.ádi
 Xook'eidí
 Kaax'oos.hittaan
 Neix.ádi  (Eagle/Beaver/Halibut)

See also
Ganhada
Laxgibuu
History of the Tlingit

References

 Emmons, George Thornton (1991). The Tlingit Indians. Volume 70 in Anthropological Papers of the American Museum of Natural History. Edited with additions by Frederica De Laguna. New York: American Museum of Natural History. .
 Hope III, Andrew (2008). Traditional Tlingit Country – Map and Tribal List. Juneau, Alaska: Alaska Native Knowledge Network.

Tlingit culture
First Nations history in British Columbia
Native American history of Alaska
Alaska Native ethnic groups
Native American tribes in Alaska